Chaetodoria is a genus of tachinid flies in the family Tachinidae.

Species
Chaetodoria conica Townsend, 1927

Distribution
Peru.

References

Exoristinae
Taxa named by Charles Henry Tyler Townsend
Tachinidae genera
Diptera of South America